The Local Government and Rating Act 1997 (c. 29) allows a community at the village, neighbourhood, town or similar level beneath a district or borough council to demand its own elected parish or town council. This right only applies to communities within England and outside of Greater London. The Local Government and Public Involvement in Health Act 2007 would later extend the parish petition right to places within Greater London.

Section 11 of the Act allows any such community to collect a petition for a new parish or town council and also to define the area that it shall cover. Once the petition meets a certain threshold of registered electors’ signatures, the local metropolitan borough council, district council or unitary authority cannot stop it. The final decision as to whether any community can have its own parish council is down to the Secretary of State for Communities and Local Government.

External links

United Kingdom Acts of Parliament 1997
Local government legislation in England and Wales